Rasmus Bele Åke Wranå (born 15 November 1994) is a Swedish curler from Karlstad. He currently plays second for the Swedish national team, skipped by Niklas Edin. With his teammates Edin, Oskar Eriksson, and Christoffer Sundgren, Wranå became part of the first and only team in history to win four consecutive gold medals at the World Men's Curling Championship. In 2017, Wranå and these same teammates also became the first non-Canadian men's curling team to win three Grand Slam tournaments and the Pinty's Cup, with Wranå reaching 18 Grand Slam playoffs overall during his time with Team Edin. Along with Anders Kraupp, he is one of only two male curlers in Sweden to have won all three Swedish national championships in which he was eligible to compete in the senior division – men's team curling, mixed curling, and mixed doubles.

Awards
 : Gold; Silver.
 : Gold; Silver.
 Swedish Men's Curling Championship: Gold (2018, 2019, 2020); Bronze (2016).
 World Junior Curling Championships: Silver (2012).
 Swedish Junior Curling Championships: Gold (2012, 2016).
 World Mixed Curling Championship: Silver (2015).
 Swedish Mixed Curling Championship: Gold (2015, 2016); Bronze (2014).
 Swedish Mixed Doubles Curling Championship: Gold (2020); Bronze (2013, 2016).
 Continental Cup of Curling (Team World): Gold (2019, 2020; Silver (2017, 2018).
 In 2018 he was inducted into the Swedish Curling Hall of Fame.

Teams

Men's

Mixed

Mixed doubles

Grand Slam record

Personal life
His father is Mats Wranå, Swedish curler and coach. His sister is Isabella Wranå, Swedish curler.

References

External links

Line-Up | Team Edin official site

Living people
1994 births
Sportspeople from Stockholm
Sportspeople from Karlstad
Swedish male curlers
Curlers at the 2018 Winter Olympics
Curlers at the 2022 Winter Olympics
Olympic curlers of Sweden
Olympic gold medalists for Sweden
Olympic silver medalists for Sweden
Medalists at the 2018 Winter Olympics
Medalists at the 2022 Winter Olympics
Olympic medalists in curling
World curling champions
European curling champions
Swedish curling champions
Curlers at the 2012 Winter Youth Olympics
Continental Cup of Curling participants
21st-century Swedish people